Dulgan (also Romanized as Dūlgān and Dūlogān; also known as Dūlenjān-e Peyvandī and Dūlūgān) is a village in Abezhdan Rural District, Abezhdan District, Andika County, Khuzestan Province, Iran. At the 2006 census, its population was 16, in 4 families.

References 

Populated places in Andika County